Eupithecia poecilata is a moth in the family Geometridae. It is found on Corsica and Sardinia.

The wingspan is about 16 mm.

References

Moths described in 1888
poecilata
Moths of Europe
Taxa named by Rudolf Püngeler